Querida Bamako  is a 2007 Spanish film.

Synopsis 
Moussa is a young boy from Burkina Faso. He was born and lives in the same village as his parents, his family and his wife, Fatima, although he prefers to call her "Bamako", as he met her there, in the capital of Mali, before they got married and had their baby, Mamadou. Although the land gives them enough to live on, the precarious balance has been upset by a long drought. Driven by the need to feed his family, and having asked the elders’ advice, Moussa decides to emigrate to Europe.

External links 

 

2007 films
Spanish drama films
Films shot in Africa
2000s Spanish films